Nervo is a crater on Mercury. It has a diameter of 63 kilometers. Its name was adopted by the International Astronomical Union in 1979. Nervo is named for the Mexican poet Amado Nervo, who lived from 1870 to 1919.

Hollows are present on and near the central peak of Nervo.

To the east of Nervo are linear ridges trending radially from the Caloris basin, believed to be ejecta from the Caloris impact event, similar to Imbrium sculpture on the Moon.

References

Impact craters on Mercury